Bilat is a village situated under the East Siang district, Arunachal Pradesh. The Village is 40 km away from its district headquarters Pasighat and is in the bank of the Peneng river.

References

Villages in East Siang district